Hutchinson High School may refer to:

Hutchinson High School (Alaska) — Fairbanks, Alaska
Hutchinson High School (Kansas) — Hutchinson, Kansas
Hutchinson High School (Minnesota) — Hutchinson, Minnesota
Hutchinson Central Technical High School — Buffalo, New York